Butene, also known as butylene, is an alkene with the formula .  The word butene may refer to any of the individual compounds.  They are colourless gases that are present in crude oil as a minor constituent in quantities that are too small for viable extraction.  Butene is therefore obtained by catalytic cracking of long-chain hydrocarbons left during refining of crude oil. Cracking produces a mixture of products, and the butene is extracted from this by fractional distillation.

Butene can be used as the monomer for polybutene, but this polymer is more expensive than alternatives with shorter carbon chains such as polypropylene. Polybutene is therefore used in more specialized applications.  Butenes are more commonly used to make copolymer (mixed with another monomer such as ethylene).

Isomers
Among the molecules which have the chemical formula  four isomers are alkenes. All four of these hydrocarbons have four carbon atoms and one double bond in their molecules, but have different chemical structures. The IUPAC and common names, respectively, of these chemical compounds are:

In the chemical structures above, the small blue numbers in the structure images are the numbering of the atoms in the main backbone chain of the molecules. Other organic compounds have the formula C4H8, namely cyclobutane and methylcyclopropane, but are not alkenes and do not fall under the name butene. There are also cyclic alkenes with four carbon atoms overall such as cyclobutene and two isomers of methylcyclopropene, but they do not have the formula C4H8 and are not discussed here.

Properties 
All four of these isomers are gases at room temperature and pressure, but can be liquefied by lowering the temperature or raising the pressure on them, in a manner similar to pressurised butane. These gases are colourless, but do have distinct odours, and are highly flammable. Although not naturally present in petroleum in high percentages, they can be produced from petrochemicals or by catalytic cracking of petroleum. Although they are stable compounds, the carbon-carbon double bonds make them more reactive than similar alkanes, which are more inert compounds in various ways.

Because of the double bonds, these 4-carbon alkenes can act as monomers in the formation of polymers, as well as having other uses as petrochemical intermediates. They are used in the production of synthetic rubber. But-1-ene is a linear or normal alpha-olefin and isobutylene is a branched alpha-olefin. In a rather low percentage, but-1-ene is used as one of the comonomers, along with other alpha-olefins, in the production of high-density polyethylene and linear low-density polyethylene. Butyl rubber is made by cationic polymerisation of isobutylene with about 2 - 7% isoprene. Isobutylene is also used for the production of methyl tert-butyl ether (MTBE) and isooctane, both of which improve the combustion of gasoline.

See also
 1,3-Butadiene
 Alkene

References

External links
 MSDS for isobutylene

Alkenes
Monomers
GABAA receptor positive allosteric modulators